South Korean boy group ZE:A (also known as (Children of Empire) have released three studio albums, four single albums, two compilation albums, four extended plays, nine video albums, and fourteen singles.

Albums

Studio albums

Single albums

Compilation albums

Extended plays

Singles

Other charted songs

Other appearances

Soundtrack appearances

Video albums

Sub-unit discography 
ZE:A has debuted three sub-units: ZE:A Five, ZE:A 4U, and ZE:A J. 

ZE:A Five includes members Kevin, Siwan, Minwoo, Hyungsik, and Dongjun. ZE:A 4U includes members, Junyoung, Kwanghee, Heechul, and Taeheon. And ZE:A J includes members Kevin, Taeheon, Heechul, Minwoo, and Dongjun.

Extended plays

Singles

Video albums

Notes

References

Discographies of South Korean artists
K-pop music group discographies